David McManus (born 30 July 1955) is an Irish judoka. He competed in the men's half-middleweight event at the 1980 Summer Olympics.

References

External links
 

1955 births
Living people
Irish male judoka
Olympic judoka of Ireland
Judoka at the 1980 Summer Olympics
Place of birth missing (living people)